The Hessians Motorcycle Club or Hessians MC are an American outlaw motorcycle club. Like many one-percenter MCs, they prefer to ride Harley-Davidson motorcycles.

History
The Hessians Motorcycle Club was founded on March 7, 1968, in Southern California. The club would soon expand across the nation's western seaboard and in 1972, they claimed to have around 500 members across the United States.

The club's logo features a sabre-pierced skull over an Iron Cross.

Criminal allegations and incidents
In 1994, eight members of the Hessians MC were arrested on drug and weapons charges following a series of raids in California that were conducted by federal, state, county and local law enforcement agencies. The crackdown stemmed from 
an 8-month investigation into the club, in which ATF agents infiltrated the group's 20-member mother chapter.

References 

Outlaw motorcycle clubs
Gangs in California
Gangs in Colorado
Gangs in Nevada
Gangs in Oklahoma
Gangs in Oregon